Bishop McGuinness Catholic High School (McGuinness) is a college-preparatory secondary school located in Oklahoma City, Oklahoma, United States.  It has an enrollment of 720 students in grades 9 through 12, is co-educational, and serves as part of the Archdiocese of Oklahoma City in the Roman Catholic Church.

History

The school was founded in 1950 by the archdiocese as “Central Catholic High School.” Despite the name, the school was on the northern fringe of Oklahoma City at the time. The name "Central" referred to the fact that the school was founded as a replacement for multiple small parish-based parochial high schools that had become outdated by the 1950s. As a result, then-bishop Eugene J. McGuinness ordered parochial high schools in the Oklahoma City area closed and consolidated into the new school (the only exception being Mount Saint Mary High School in south Oklahoma City). The school colors (Kelly Green and White) were adopted in 1951, with the school mascot (“Clancy”) and the nickname (“Fighting Irish”) following in 1955.

In 1959, the school was renamed in honor of McGuinness, who had died in 1957.

In 1960, the school received full accreditation from the North Central Association of Colleges and Schools and the Oklahoma Department of Education. The school is also affiliated with the National Catholic Educational Association, the College Board, and the National Association of Secondary School Principals.

The Class of 1962 provided the school with its primary tradition when it donated a rendition of the "Clancy" mascot on the tile floor of the school. From 1962 to the school's renovation in 2006, the tradition dictated that each year's senior class protect the image from being trod upon by any student. After the renovation, the tile image was moved to a special display.

Campus

The school's campus has been located at the intersection of 50th Street and Western Avenue in Oklahoma City since its founding.  The main academic building was completed in 1950, with a gymnasium and football stadium following in 1951.  Improvements since that time have included the creation of a track and field complex in 1987, a new theology and art center wing in 1991, the Blessed Pier Giorgio Frassati Chapel in 1998, and the renovation of the main auditorium into the Father John Petuskey Performing Arts Auditorium in 2002.

In 2006, after a three-year, $9.5 million capital campaign, the school opened the David L. Morton Educational Facility, named after the current Principal, a building which substantially replaced the prior main academic building. The facility includes new classrooms, offices, a student commons area, and a new academic information center named in honor of Father Stanley Rother.

In 2008 the school opened the refurbished McCarthy Gymnasium, including updated facilities for the basketball, wrestling, and volleyball programs. That year, the school also unveiled a refurbishment of its football complex, including new weight training facilities, football offices, and a new facade to Pribil Stadium.

In 2012, the School added on an addition to their Senior Hall, being the new Lecture Hall. This new Lecture hall also includes 5 new classrooms now known as the Math Wing of the school. The Lecture Hall also provides students with larger class sizes to allow students to experience a college setting.

Academics

The school is one of the more rigorous college-preparatory schools in Oklahoma.  Ninety-nine percent (99.5%) of its student body goes on to college (.5% Army), and the school has generated 21 National Merit Scholar Semifinalists or Finalists in the last 5 years. As of 2018, the school offers Advanced Placement (AP) courses in 21 subject areas.

In 2004, McGuinness was recognized in the first annual Catholic High School Honor Roll as one of the Top 50 Catholic High Schools in the United States. In that year, the school was also noted as a Top-20 school in the subcategory of "Civic Education." This Top-50 distinction was repeated in 2005, 2006 (with a Top-25 Civic Education ranking), and again in 2007. In 2010, the school received Honorable Mention as one of six schools in the "Academics" subcategory.

Extra-curricular academic opportunities include a student newspaper, the Chi Rhoan, which publishes every other month and received the “All Oklahoma Award” at Oklahoma Scholastic Media's 93rd annual competition in 2009, in addition to other more recent awards. The school's Academic Team won the OSSAA Academic Bowl Class 3A State Championship in both 1999 and 2000, and the Class 5A State Championship in 2022.

Athletics

Athletics have been a part of McGuinness's tradition since its inception. After initially competing in Catholic school leagues within the state, McGuinness was first accepted to the major state athletic regulatory body—the Oklahoma Secondary School Activities Association (OSSAA)—in 1966, allowing it to officially compete against public secondary schools.  Since that time, McGuinness has won 88 state titles in its classification across eighteen sports.  Sports Illustrated rated the McGuinness #11 on its national Top 25 High School Athletic Programs list for the 2007–08 school year.

The Bishop McGuinness Boys Basketball Tournament, founded in 1961, is a fixture of the winter schedule and is the oldest interscholastic high school basketball tournament in the state.

In football, McGuinness shares a tradition with cross-state rival Bishop Kelley High School, which together form the two largest private schools in the state. The winner of the contest obtains possession of the "Shillelagh Trophy" for the upcoming year. The schools also compete biannually in boys' and girls' basketball.

Based on its enrollment, McGuinness competes by default in Class 5A athletics within the OSSAA.  However, certain sports compete on an ad hoc basis in Class 6A (OSSAA's highest class) due to a particular rule.  In April 2011, the OSSAA passed amendments to its classification rules for private schools that allowed the OSSAA to re-classify certain individual sports one level above their normal enrollment-based classification.  Currently, the OSSAA re-classifies McGuinness for competition in Class 6A in select sports including cross country, volleyball, and basketball.  A lawsuit was filed by McGuinness against the OSSAA concerning this issue on September 8, 2014. It was announced in June 2015 that OSSAA has put a cap that no team can move up to 6A; the highest they can go is 5A, which means that McGuinness will be in 5A for all sports starting in the 2015–2016 season.

Notable alumni
Blake Bailey, author best known for literary biographies, winner of 2009 National Book Critics Circle Award
Janet Barresi, Former  Oklahoma State Superintendent of Public Instruction
Sanford Coats, former  United States Attorney for the Western District of Oklahoma.
Bernard M. Jones, a United States District Judge of the United States District Court for the Western District of Oklahoma and a former United States magistrate judge of the same court.
David Dank, member of Oklahoma House of Representatives from 2007 until his death in 2015
Dan Fagin, author and environmental journalist, winner of 2014 Pulitzer Prize for General Nonfiction
Gabe Ikard, retired National Football League offensive lineman, former radio host on KRXO-FM and current podcaster.
Vicki Miles-LaGrange, Chief U.S. District Judge for the Western District of Oklahoma.
Daniel Orton, 2010 NBA Draft first-round selection to Orlando Magic.

Notes

External links
  Bishop McGuinness official website
 Peterson's Private Secondary Schools (2008): Bishop McGuinness Catholic High School

Roman Catholic Archdiocese of Oklahoma City
Schools in Oklahoma City
Catholic secondary schools in Oklahoma
Educational institutions established in 1950
Schools in Oklahoma County, Oklahoma
1950 establishments in Oklahoma
Private high schools in Oklahoma